Interstate 275 (I-275), located in Florida, is a  auxiliary Interstate Highway serving the Tampa Bay area. Its southern terminus is at I-75 near Palmetto, where I-275 heads west towards the Sunshine Skyway Bridge crossing over Tampa Bay. From that point, I-275 passes through St. Petersburg before crossing Tampa Bay again on the Howard Frankland Bridge, then continues through the city of Tampa, where it connects to an interchange with I-4 in Downtown Tampa. After the interchange, I-275 passes north through the Tampa suburbs to its northern terminus at I-75 in Wesley Chapel.

Route description

Southern terminus to St. Petersburg
I-275 begins at exit 228 of I-75 with two lanes in either direction in rural Palmetto. I-275 immediately heads west of its parent Interstate and has an interchange with US Highway 41 (US 41)  up the road. I-275's next interchange is with US 19, beginning a concurrency that lasts . After this exit, I-275 reaches the southern toll plaza for the Sunshine Skyway Bridge. There is a corresponding northern toll plaza for southbound travelers. The Sunshine Skyway Bridge is a  bridge that spans Tampa Bay. After reaching the northern end of the bridge, I-275 enters St. Petersburg.

St. Petersburg
At the northern end of the bridge, drivers briefly drive on the left side as the freeway's lanes invert for about half a mile before US 19 exits the freeway at exit 17, serving as a local road in St. Petersburg. At this point, the Interstate expands to three lanes. I-275 has multiple exits in the city, each of them serving the residential neighborhoods that the freeway passes through. Between exits 22 and 23, the highway becomes two lanes each way, expanding back to three thereafter. I-275 then has a major interchange with I-175, which provides access to Albert Whitted Airport and Tropicana Field, home of the Tampa Bay Rays. The next major interchange occurs less than  down the road with I-375, providing access to the waterfront along Tampa Bay. After this exit, I-275 continues through residential neighborhoods, widening to four lanes each way between exits 25 and 26, though the right lane in both directions being designated "exit only". It eventually passes beside Sawgrass Lake Park and then through an area of marshland. The freeway widens to four lanes in either direction at exit 30 before reaching its last interchange in St. Petersburg with SR 687 (4th Street). After traveling  in St. Petersburg, I-275 crosses the Howard Frankland Bridge over Old Tampa Bay into Tampa.

Tampa
I-275 reduces to three lanes at exit 39, as well as has an interchange with SR 60 thereat, which provides access to SR 589 and Tampa International Airport. At this point, I-275 thins down to three lanes in either direction and remains this way for the rest of the freeway. I-275 then has an interchange with US 92, the first of two interchanges with the road, allowing access to Downtown Tampa. I-275 then crosses the Hillsborough River for the first time along its route. Afterward,  from its entry into Tampa, I-275 has its next major interchange with I-4, a junction known locally as "Malfunction Junction". This junction was always clogged with daily rush-hour traffic and was subsequently overhauled. This interchange serves as I-4's western terminus and allows access to Orlando and the east coast of Florida. Furthermore, the freeway expands to four lanes through the interchange. After this major exit, I-275 reaches an interchange with US 92 again, also allowing access to US 41. After this interchange, US 41 acts as the local road for the freeway for the rest of its route. I-275 crosses the Hillsborough River a second time and enters residential neighborhoods within Tampa. I-275 travels due north and parallel to US 41 for  before turning northeast toward I-75. At this point, I-275 exits Tampa and enters Lutz, a suburb of Tampa. I-275 then reconnects with its parent Interstate Highway (I-75) and reaches its northern terminus.

History

Initial construction in Tampa

I-275 originally opened in 1962 as a segment of I-75, from the present northern terminus to a diamond interchange at SR 678 (Bearss Avenue). The portion of I-4 that would later become a part of I-275, the Howard Frankland Bridge, and its short freeway stubs at the bridge's endpoints, opened to traffic about a year earlier. In 1964, the stub of what was then known as I-4 between 50th Street (through "Malfunction Junction") and Armenia Avenue was completed. "Malfunction Junction's" northern end was a pair of ramp stubs that would later be filled in by I-75. In 1965, the segment of I-75 from "Malfunction Junction" to about Sligh Avenue was completed, and, by 1967, the remaining gaps in I-4 and I-75 were filled and opened to traffic.

Controversy and repeated delays in Pinellas
Around 1970, plans for the extension of I-75 into Pinellas County began. However, the first round of local opposition would lead to the eventual (and repeated) delays of I-75 through St. Petersburg. The first setback was led by 4th Street business owners and residents who demanded that construction on I-75 be stopped, since the bridge was already funneling unwanted traffic into the corridor. It has since seen many unforeseen business and residential booms due to the building of this bridge. At the same time, construction began on I-75 from SR 686 (Roosevelt Boulevard) to about 38th Avenue North. By this time, I-4 was truncated to "Malfunction Junction", allowing the I-75 designation take over the freeway from the junction to 4th Street North. This segment was opened to traffic in 1973, with the gap between Roosevelt and 9th Street filled in a few years later. Around this time, I-75 was redesignated as I-275, and, after some more local opposition, I-275 was constructed to meander down to SR 595 (5th Avenue North), near downtown St. Petersburg, in 1975.

The construction of I-275 over nearly a 50-year period between 1970 and 2016 uprooted many Black families in the Methodist Town, Gas Plant, and 22nd Street neighborhoods. These practices of eminent domain by the St. Petersburg government helped to shut down small companies in these neighborhoods and sustained white businesses that were located more centrally. Families in the Gas Plant neighborhood were assured good jobs at Tropicana Field to help ease the burden of moving. During the 1970s, the government removed 285 buildings and 500 families to help build the Interstate which cost $11.3 million (equivalent to $ in ). The widespread demolition included 10 Black-American churches. The families in the bulldozed Gas Plant neighborhood were guaranteed cheaper homes and 600 new jobs by the city, but these offers were never delivered.

Many members in the affected neighborhoods found the actions taken by the government to be very controversial. In 1977, Chester James was appointed by the city government as the representative from Methodist Town to vote on the future development plans of his neighborhood. However, the city's unclear plans led him to vote in favor of evicting 377 families (including his own) from the neighborhood. There is also contention about the location of I-275 in southwest St. Petersburg, as its current placement is very similar to that of the 1935 segregation initiative perimeter.

Financial burdens through this part of the project caused further delays. However, I-375 opened partially to traffic in 1979, with full operation by 1981, and I-175 opened up in 1980.

With both downtown feeders now open, I-275 was extended to 28th Street South. However, another round of community revolts delayed the segment of I-275 between 28th Street South and 22nd Avenue South. In spite of the delay, the stretch was built by 1981. Exit 20 was configured for an anticipated westward expansion to a planned Pinellas Beltway. A freeway revolt killed many of Pinellas County's freeways during the 1970s and repeatedly delayed the construction of I-275. In addition, the Sunshine Skyway Bridge collapse on May 9, 1980, during which the freighter MV Summit Venture took down one of the two spans of the Sunshine Skyway Bridge and killed 35 people, reduced a portion of I-275 to two lanes until the opening of the present bridge in April 1987.

In 1982, the segment between 22nd Avenue South and 39th Avenue South was opened to traffic. The Pinellas Bayway/US 19 interchange, opened to traffic in 1983–1984, is inverted for about half a mile. The reason for this configuration is unknown; however, to this day, traffic continues to flow smoothly through the interchange with very little congestion. At about the same time this interchange opened, I-275 was completed from the Sunshine Skyway Bridge to the southern terminus with I-75 in Manatee County.

When the new Sunshine Skyway Bridge opened in 1987, the final link of I-275, between US 19 and the bridge, was completed and opened to traffic.

Reconstruction and later changes
The segment of I-275 between Veterans Expressway (SR 589) and Himes Avenue was widened from four to six lanes in 1974. Additionally, a median barrier was built along the highway from Himes Avenue to Downtown Tampa.

Until the 1980s, the Memorial Highway/Veterans Expressway interchange was only a half diamond, and the West Shore Boulevard interchange was a full diamond. Both interchanges underwent drastic changes to allow safe, free-flowing movement to and from Tampa International Airport and the Veterans Expressway. Among the improvements, three free-flowing exit and entry ramps were added to the expressway from I-275. The exit ramp from I-275 south to the Veterans Expressway northbound was reconstructed, and the ramp from Memorial Highway northbound from Kennedy Boulevard onto northbound I-275 was removed, along with the two western ramps onto West Shore Boulevard (truncating the West Shore interchange to a half diamond), in order to deter accidents that were being caused by commuters entering and exiting the Interstate from the Veterans Expressway. In addition, connections from I-275 north, to Cypress Street were made (though the ramps are underutilized today). In 2004, the ramp from southbound Veterans Expressway to southbound I-275 was realigned in order to ease congestion on the mainline lanes of the Interstate.

In 1984, the Himes Avenue exit/entrance was constructed. The exit was originally rumored to supplement a failed redevelopment project in the area during that time. Today, the Himes Avenue connection serves as reliever for nearby Raymond James Stadium.

In 1991, following the expansion of the Howard Frankland Bridge, the 4th Street North interchange was reconstructed.

In 1994, the two drawbridges on the northern approach to the Sunshine Skyway Bridge, dating to the original twin Sunshine Skyway bridges, were replaced with high-level fixed spans, eliminating bottlenecks caused by openings.

Between 1994 and 1998, there were no major projects taking place on the highway, and I-275 saw very few changes. The hiatus ended in 1999, when a much needed, dual-stage, widening project took place between SR 580 (Busch Boulevard) and Bearss Avenue. The project widened I-275 mainline from four to six lanes, rehabilitated the existing concrete surfaces, and improved interchange flow, lighting, signage, and drainage. The project was completed in 2003.

The northern toll plaza to the Sunshine Skyway Bridge was relocated south of the approach bridge in 2000 due to a lack of capacity. The original plaza only allowed three lanes, while the replacement allows six lanes to flow through, with the sixth lane dedicated to SunPass users.

In 2001, the widening project for I-275 between SR 694 (Gandy Boulevard) and SR 686 began. The project increased I-275 from six to eight lanes, and its existing concrete surfaces were rehabilitated. A reconfiguration of the SR 686 interchange (exit 30) started in 2001 and added access to 118th Avenue North at the same interchange. The new connection to 118th Avenue North is the first phase of a proposed freeway to connect I-275 to the Bayside Bridge (although it is unclear if future segments will be built). All construction in this area was completed by 2002. Reconstruction of I-275 between SR 686 and SR 687 quickly followed the widening project. Lane counts on I-275 were increased from four to mostly six lanes (with some eight-lane segments). The Ulmerton Road and 9th Street North interchanges were originally narrow 1959 configurations that caused much congestion in the area. Additionally, the 9th Street North/Martin Luther King Jr. Street North exit and Ulmerton Road entrance ramps were situated in the left lane of I-275, causing dangerous weaving patterns. These interchanges were reconstructed into right-lane configurations, and two new ramps were added from Ulmerton Road (one leading to 9th Street North and one exiting onto southbound I-275). The southbound I-275 exits to Ulmerton Road and Martin Luther King Jr. Street North were combined into one exit ramp to provide better flow. The Martin Luther King Jr. Street North interchange was shut down for several months as a result of the reconstruction. Finally, the ramps to and from 118th Avenue North were opened to traffic. The entire reconstruction project along I-275 in the Gateway area was completed in 2005.

In 2003 operational improvements began for the notorious "Malfunction Junction" in Downtown Tampa. The project consisted of widening mainline I-275 and I-4, along with an array of ramp and bridge improvements, lighting and drainage work, and new signs. The entire project was completed on December 22, 2006, with intelligent transportation system (ITS) components installed by March 2007. The renovation of the I-4 corridor through Ybor City was finished around mid-2007, almost one year ahead of schedule.

The staged reconstruction project for I-275 between the Howard Frankland Bridge and Downtown Tampa was supposed to begin in mid-2006. However, bids received by the Florida Department of Transportation (FDOT) for the project came in at $100 million (40 percent) over the projected estimates, which was blamed on the rising cost of asphalt and other materials, which was, in turn, partly blamed on the rising oil prices worldwide. As a result, FDOT commenced with the project in four smaller phases, rather than the original, large-scale, two-phase project. Construction began on phase one, the northbound lanes (south of the existing interstate) between Himes Avenue and Downtown Tampa, on August 13, 2007, and was completed in April 2010. Phase two, which includes construction of the northbound lanes from the Westshore area to Himes, was originally scheduled to begin in 2008 but was delayed further. The third phase will consist of transferring northbound traffic onto the new northbound lanes, southbound traffic onto the existing northbound lanes, and the construction of the new southbound lanes from Himes to downtown. Finally, the fourth and final phase will construct the new southbound lanes from the Westshore area to Himes. The entire project was originally scheduled to be completed by around 2013 or 2014, but it was extended until early 2015 and costed an estimated $540 million (equivalent to $ in ), an increase from the original $350-million (equivalent to $ in ) budget. Finally, on March 30, 2015, the fourth and final phase was finished with the new lanes finally opening, ending the long term project in Downtown Tampa.

Between Himes Avenue and downtown, southbound (westbound) traffic was shifted on to the original northbound lanes. However, those wishing to exit at either the Howard/Armenia or Himes avenues exits continue on the original southbound lanes. Those exiting on Himes Avenue have one dedicated lane in the original southbound lanes. Traffic entering the freeway from Armenia Avenue now does so on the original northbound exit ramp. This creates an odd left-lane merge situation. However, to help motorists in this effort, the entrance ramp has a dedicated lane from the freeway entrance until just over the Himes Avenue bridge. Traffic heading northbound on Howard Avenue must now turn left onto Green Avenue, left onto Armenia Avenue, and then right onto the entrance ramp in order to enter the freeway. While this setup is temporary, it has somewhat improved traffic flow in the area, as motorists who intend to exit at Howard/Armenia or Himes avenues now exit the freeway much earlier.

In January 2011, construction began on widening the northernmost segment of I-275 from US 41 (Nebraska Avenue) to the I-75 apex from four to six lanes. The project also includes constructing a dedicated flyover ramp over I-75 towards SR 56. This ramp, along with a new, extended ramp from I-75 to SR 56, opened on August 18, 2011.

On February 4, 2011, a new ramp connecting northbound I-275 to 118th Avenue North opened. This project, beginning in July 2009 and involving widening the existing ramp from northbound I-275 to SR 686, is being performed in conjunction with the project to build the Mid Pinellas Expressway, which has suffered numerous delays due to a lack of funding.

Other improvements

Other sections not requiring a full-scale reconstruction have undergone improvements:
 Concrete rehabilitation from 62nd Avenue North to exit 17 in Pinellas County, complete, 2001–2005
 Resurfacing from the Howard Frankland Bridge to Himes Avenue (exit 41C), complete, 2002
 Resurfacing from the US 41 overpass (exit 53) to I-75 junction in Lutz, complete, 2003
 Resurfacing from the Howard Frankland Bridge to SR 687, complete, 2006
 Concrete rehabilitation/bridge upgrade/lighting improvements from "Malfunction Junction" to Busch Boulevard, complete, 2007
 Concrete rehabilitation from 26th Avenue North to exit 23, complete, 2008
 Rehabilitation at exit 28, complete, 2008
 Resurfacing between exit 17 to the Misner Bridge in Pinellas County (currently ongoing)
 Widening of the northbound exit ramp at exit 51 in Hillsborough County, complete, 2012
 Redesigning and reconstructing a new bridge for SR 687 bridge at exit 32 southbound (currently ongoing)

The segment of I-275 in Manatee County has not changed dramatically since its construction in 1983, other than a toll plaza upgrade in the late 1990s and resurfacing of the mainline lanes between the I-75 apex and the US 19 exit. It is unclear if any other improvements are planned at this time.

Naming of the highway
In November 2005, The Florida Legislature dedicated the section of I-275 in Pinellas County as the "St. Petersburg Parkway/William C. Cramer Memorial Highway". William Cato Cramer was a native of St. Petersburg who served as a member of the Florida Legislature from 1955 through 1971. He helped to procure the building of I-275 through Pinellas County.

Services
I-275 has two rest areas, one at each end of the Sunshine Skyway Bridge. Both rest areas, each accessible by traffic in both directions, have rest rooms, vending machines, picnic tables, dog walk areas, and nighttime security. These rest areas also provide access to the fishing piers, for an extra fee.

Exit list

See also

References

External links

75-2 Florida
75-2
75-2
75-2
275
275
Expressways in the Tampa Bay area
2 Florida
Transportation in Manatee County, Florida
Roads in Manatee County, Florida
1973 establishments in Florida